Deutsche Schule Santa Cruz is a German international school in Santa Cruz de la Sierra, Bolivia.

It serves levels Kindergarten through the sixth year of secondary school.

See also
 Ethnic Germans in Bolivia

References

External links
  Deutsche Schule Santa Cruz
  Deutsche Schule Santa Cruz

Santa Cruz
International schools in Santa Cruz de la Sierra